Wah! Wah! Kya Baat Hai! is an Indian comic poetry series produced by Neela Tele Films Private Limited which premiered on 15 September 2012 on SAB TV. The series was hosted by Shailesh Lodha and Neha Mehta, known respectively as Taarak Mehta and his wife, Anjali Taarak Mehta, from the long-running series Taarak Mehta Ka Ooltah Chashmah.

Overview
The format of the show is based on 'Haasya Kavi Sammelan', which will retain the essence of ‘hasya kavita’, making it less severe, without trivializing the poetry. In every episode, three noteworthy poets of Hindi literature are invited. It also has a segment called 'chupa rustam' in which the performers who are not much popular are invited and given a chance to recite their poem in front of the whole audience and are awarded 'smriti chinha' (award and prize )and are encouraged to carry out doing such task. And at the end a few small clips are shown concluding that even the common man can recite hasya kavita and coveys a message that every person has a poet inside of him.

Performers
Many renowned Hindi Hasya Kavis, Geetkaars (Songwriters) and Urdu Shayars have recited their poems in this show. Some of them were Suryakumar PandeyShambhu Shikhar, Chirag Jain, Sanjay Jhala, Santosh Anand,Hariom Panwar, Anjum Rehbar, Anamika Jain Ambar, Suresh Albela, Praveen Shukla], Munawwar Rana, Kunwar Bechain, Yogesh, Rahat Indori, Nida Fazli, Ravindra Jain, Mujawar Malegavi, Sunder Malegavi, Dr. Vishnu Saxena, Haresh Chaturvedi, Pradeep Chobey, Surendra Dubey, Popular Meeruthi, Mahendra Ajanabi, Vedprakash Ved, Padma Albela, Mahesh Dubey and Dinesh Diggaj.

References

External links
 Official Site on SAB TV

Sony SAB original programming
2012 Indian television series debuts
2013 Indian television series endings
Indian stand-up comedy television series
Indian poetry